Robert or Bob Eaton may refer to:

 Robert James Eaton (aka Bob Eaton, born 1940), auto executive
 Robert Eaton (politician) (1871–1964), former Alberta politician
 Robert G. Eaton (aka Bob Eaton, 1937–2009), politician in Ontario, Canada
 Robert Young Eaton (1875–1956), Canadian retailer
 Bobby Eaton (Robert Lee Eaton, 1958–2021), American wrestler
 Bob Eaton (diver) (born 1952), Canadian Olympic diver
 Bob Eaton (theatre director), English theatre director, writer and manager who has been featured at the Royal Court Theatre, Liverpool